KOI8-B is the informal name for an 8-bit Roman / Cyrillic character set constituting the common subset of the major KOI-8 variants (KOI8-R, KOI8-U, KOI8-RU, KOI8-E, KOI8-F). Accordingly, it is closely related to KOI8-R, but defines only the letter subset in the upper half. As such it was implemented by some font vendors for PC Unixes like Xenix in the late 1980s.

Character set
The following table shows the KOI8-B encoding. Each character is shown with its equivalent Unicode code point.

See also 
 KOI character encodings

References

External links
http://czyborra.com/charsets/koi8-b.txt.gz
http://czyborra.com/charsets/koi8-b.bdf.gz

Character sets
Computing in the Soviet Union